Ehud Yatom (born 26 September 1948) is an Israeli former Shin Bet agent and politician who  served as a member of the Knesset for Likud between 2003 and 2006.

Biography
Ehud Yatom was born in Netanya. He is the brother of Danny Yatom. He worked for the Shin Bet and was one of the agents who killed two terrorists in the Kav 300 extra judicial killing in 1984, by smashing their heads with rocks. In 2001, Israel's High Court of Justice ruled that Yatom was unfit to serve as a top government anti-terror advisor six months after he was named for the position by Prime Minister Ariel Sharon.

Political career
In the 2003 elections he was placed 23rd on the Likud list, and entered the Knesset when the party won 38 seats. Whilst an MK, he served as a member of several committees; the Foreign Affairs and Defense Committee, the Internal Affairs and Environment Committee and the Labour, Welfare and Health Committee. He was also a member of the parliamentary inquiry committee for the Amona events.

Prior to the 2006 elections he placed 32nd on the Likud list, and lost his seat when the party won only 12 seats.

References

External links

1948 births
Living people
Israeli Jews
Israeli people of Romanian-Jewish descent
Likud politicians
Members of the 16th Knesset (2003–2006)
People from Netanya
People of the Shin Bet